USCGC Forrest Rednour (WPC-1129) is the 29th  cutter built for the United States Coast Guard. She is the first of the four vessels of her class to be home-ported in San Pedro, California.  Other sister ships have been based in Florida, Mississippi, Puerto Rico, New Jersey, North Carolina, Hawaii and Alaska.  But Forrest Rednour is the first to be homeported on the west coast of the lower 48 states.  The vessel will be homeported at a base near Los Angeles' Terminal Island.  Three sister ships will join her, at this base.

Design

Like her sister ships, Forrest Rednour is designed to perform search and rescue missions, port security, and the interception of smugglers.  She is armed with a remotely-controlled, gyro-stabilized 25 mm autocannon, four crew served M2 Browning machine guns, and light arms. She is equipped with a stern launching ramp, that allows her to launch or retrieve a water-jet propelled high-speed auxiliary boat, without first coming to a stop.  Her high-speed boat has over-the-horizon capability, and is useful for inspecting other vessels, and deploying boarding parties.

Operational history

Forrest Rednour arrived at Los Angeles on August 13, 2018.

Namesake

In 2010, Charles "Skip" W. Bowen, who was then the United States Coast Guard's most senior non-commissioned officer, proposed that all 58 cutters in the Sentinel class should be named after enlisted sailors in the Coast Guard, or one of its precursor services, who were recognized for their heroism.  In 2015 the Coast Guard announced that Forrest Rednour would be the namesake of the 29th cutter.

References 

Sentinel-class cutters
Ships of the United States Coast Guard
2018 ships
Ships built in Lockport, Louisiana